"Nights Like This" is a song by American singer Kehlani featuring Ty Dolla Sign. It was released on January 10, 2019, on Zane Lowe's World Record on Beats 1, as the lead single from their third and second commercial mixtape While We Wait. The song has obtained over 450 million streams on Spotify as of December 2022.

Background 
"Nights Like This" was announced by Kehlani via their Instagram on January 7, 2019. The song was written by Kehlani, Nolan Lambroza and Ty Dolla Sign and produced by Sir Nolan.

The song's lyrics dissect a failed relationship, in which Kehlani questions the intentions of their former lover, a girl who is alluded to as being bisexual. Ty Dolla Sign's verse describes the perspective of the male referred to in the song.

Music video 
The song's accompanying music video premiered on January 10, 2019, on Kehlani's YouTube account, and as of February 2023 it has over 53 million views on YouTube.

Personnel 
 DannyBoyStyles – producer
 Sir Nolan – producer
 Tony Maserati – mixing engineer
 Agent 47 – vocal engineer
 Chris Athens – mastering engineer
 Elliott Trent - Writer

Charts

Weekly charts

Year-end charts

Certifications

Release history

References 

2019 singles
2019 songs
Atlantic Records singles
Kehlani songs
Songs written by Sir Nolan
Songs written by Kehlani
Bisexuality-related songs
Male–female vocal duets